Silver Dream Racer is a 1980 motor-racing film starring British pop star David Essex and Beau Bridges. The film was produced, written and directed by David Wickes. It was the last film to be made by the Rank Organisation.

Plot
Nick Freeman (David Essex) is an aspiring motorcycle racer, whose brother has been developing an experimental motorcycle. When his brother dies before being able to test and race the new bike, Nick inherits the responsibility to prove his brother's design. In spite of a series of tough setbacks, including the loss of his girlfriend, Nick goes into the big race at the British Grand Prix with all his energy and concentration bent on winning. However, an underhanded American racer (Beau Bridges) is also among the competitors, and is determined to ruin Nick's chances. Numerous incidents happen before Nick crosses the finish line in first place. Two completely different endings were filmed depicting Nick after he has won the race, and both versions were released.

Cast
 David Essex as Nick Freeman
 Beau Bridges as Bruce McBride
 Cristina Raines as Julie Prince
 Clarke Peters as Cider Jones
 Harry H. Corbett as Wiggins
 Diane Keen as Tina Freeman
 Lee Montague as Jack Freeman
 Sheila White as Carol
 Patrick Ryecart as Benson
 Ed Bishop as Al Peterson
 T. P. McKenna as Bank Manager
 David Baxt as Ben Mendoza
 Barrie Rutter as Privateer
 Steve Henshaw as privateer
 Doyle Richmond as Cider's Brother
 Nick Brimble as Jack Davis
 Malya Woolf as Mrs. Buonaguidi
 Stephen Hoye as Clarke Nichols
 Richard LeParmentier as Journalist
 Murray Kash as 1st TV Reporter
 Bruce Boa as 2nd TV Reporter
 Christopher Driscoll as Photographer
 Leslie Schofield as Reporter
 Robert Russell as Garage Mechanic
 Morris Perry as Financier
 Elisabeth Sladen as Bank Secretary (as Elizabeth Sladen)
 Jim McManus as Bike Salesman
 Antony Brown as Executive
 Edward Kalinski as Disco Boy
 Joanna Andrews as Disco Girl
 Vincent Wong as 1st Japanese Man
 Cecil Cheng as 2nd Japanese Man
 David Neville as Man at Bank
 Godfrey Jackman as Bank Doorman
 June Chadwick as Secretary
 Kate Harper as 1st Party Guest
 Derrie Powell as 2nd Party Guest
 Perry Cree as 3rd Party Guest

Production
Director David Wickes had just enjoyed a box office success with the feature film version of The Sweeney and he was approached by Tony Williams of the Rank Organisation asking if Wickes had a film he wanted to make. The director had been sent a script by actor Michael Billington which Wickets said, "needed a re-write, but I liked it because it was about a very human thing — dreaming the impossible dream. Tony Williams liked it too, so I went to see David Essex. I thought he might be interested because he was a keen biker himself."
 

Essex agreed to appear in the film and write the music. Wickes, who rewrote the script, said the film nearly was not made because of difficulties sourcing a 500cc racing bike ("all the big manufacturers have their own racing teams and they won't give you the time of day") but they were rescued by "a brilliant Welsh engineering company called Barton Motors" who produced "a  great-looking bike that could go respectably fast around a track." 

Tuesday Weld had talks about playing the female lead. She eventually took another role, and Cristina Raines, who had been in The Duellists, took the part. Beau Bridges was imported from the USA to co-star.

Some scenes were filmed during the 1979 Grand Prix at Silverstone, Northamptonshire. "I think we still hold the record for  using 16 Panavision cameras on a single day," said Wickes. The Silver Dream Racer was a real motorcycle, designed by Barry Hart of the Barton company. 

English motorcycle racer Roger Marshall did most of David Essex's riding for the film.

Reception
The Guardian said "the story is as boring as hell". The Los Angeles Times called it a "lively genre piece".

According to Wickes, "The picture did pretty well in the UK but a lot better overseas. Most of the reviews were 
favourable, and David’s song ‘Silver Dream Machine’ went to number two."
 
It holds a 33% fresh rating on review aggregate site Rotten Tomatoes.

References

External links
 

1980 films
1980s sports drama films
British auto racing films
British sports drama films
Motorcycle racing films
Films shot at Pinewood Studios
1980 drama films
1980s English-language films
1980s British films